The  is a skyscraper located in Akasaka, Tokyo, Japan.

The super high-rise is a result of the "Akasaka 5-chome TBS Development Project" into the  complex together with the TBS Broadcasting Center, the Akasaka Blitz music venue, and the Akasaka ACT Theater. It is home to the headquarters of Hakuhodo, Inpex and Tokyo Electron.

References

External links

  
 Akasaka Sacas official site 

Buildings and structures completed in 2002
Buildings and structures in Minato, Tokyo
Akasaka, Tokyo
Skyscraper office buildings in Tokyo
Retail buildings in Tokyo